Svatopluk Čech Bridge or Čech Bridge is an arch bridge over the river Vltava in Prague, Czech Republic.

History and description
Construction of the bridge started in 1905 and finished in 1908.

The bridge connects the Prague districts Holešovice and the Old Town (Staré Město). Construction materials are stone (pillars) and iron (arches). Up to 1961 the roadway was made of wood – a hard species named Jarrah from Australia. The roadway got very slippery during rains.

Bridge architects were Jan Koula and Jiří Soukup. Art Nouveau style sculptures (including four put on 17.5-m-high pylons) were created by sculptors Klusáček, Wurzel, Popp and Amort.

The bridge was named after recently died Czech writer Svatopluk Čech (1846–1908); its opening became feat of Czech nation. During the occupation of Czechoslovakia by Nazis, the name of the bridge was changed (1940–1945) to Mendel Bridge (Mendelův most), after Gregor Mendel (of German ethnicity).

In 1971–1975, Svatopluk Čech Bridge went through major reconstruction, in 1953–1956 and 2000–2001 through smaller reconstructions, in 1984–1987 the sculptures were repaired.

As the only Art Nouveau style bridge in the Czech Republic, it is protected by the state as a cultural monument. It is used by tramways, cars and pedestrians.

External links

Bridge details (cz)
Entry in encyclopedia of Czech bridges (cz)
Pictures of the bridge

Art Nouveau architecture in Prague
Art Nouveau bridges
Bridges completed in 1908
Bridges in Prague
Bridges over the Vltava
1908 establishments in Austria-Hungary